The women's 800 metres event  at the 1987 IAAF World Indoor Championships was held at the Hoosier Dome in Indianapolis on 6 and 7 March.

Medalists

Results

Heats
The first 2 of each heat (Q) and next 2 fastest (q) qualified for the final.

Final

References

800
800 metres at the World Athletics Indoor Championships